ZipSlack was a specially compiled release of the Slackware Linux distribution that was designed to be lightweight and portable. It was distributed in a ZIP archive along with the Slackware release.

Installing ZipSlack only required obtaining the archive and unzipping it to the place where the user wished to install it, which means that ZipSlack did not require one to go through the process of reconfiguring existing partitions to try or install it.

Details 
ZipSlack used the UMSDOS filesystem under Linux, which means that it actually ran on top of the FAT filesystem, originally widely used by Microsoft operating systems and commonly found today on various types of removable media such as ZIP disks, SuperDisks, USB flash drives, and Secure Digital cards.

The last release of Slackware that contained ZipSlack was Slackware 11.0. Slackware 12.0 did not contain a ZipSlack setup within its distribution [1], although this change was not mentioned in its release announcement.  The most likely cause of this is the lack of UMSDOS support in Linux 2.6, as support for this filesystem type has been removed from the official Linux sources after some discussion [3 regarding it on the Linux Kernel Mailing List.

ZipSlack was quite lightweight, excluding a great deal of the software considered "normal" on an installation of a Linux-based distribution today. For example, in ZipSlack, the X Window System was not present by default, nor were any GUI-based web browsers. However, since ZipSlack was essentially just a miniature installation of Slackware, users were able to use the Slackware package management system to install whatever packages they may need.

Minimum requirements 
As downloaded, ZipSlack required approximately 100 megabytes of disk space and an Intel 80386 or compatible CPU. ZipSlack was able to run with as little as four megabytes of memory, with an add-on supplied by Slackware . However, at least eight megabytes—preferably 16—was the recommended minimum requirement [1], possibly more if the X Window System or other GUI software is going to be used with it.

The UMSDOS file system needs to be hosted on a FAT filesystem, not NTFS.

Caveats 
The archive which contained the ZipSlack distribution was too big to be decompressed with a 16-bit application such as the older versions of PKZIP for DOS systems. Instead, software such as a 32-bit DOS version of Info-ZIP (compiled with a DOS extender), Info-ZIP on Linux, or WinZip, 7-Zip, or another similarly capable utility on Microsoft Windows needed to be used. Alternatively, the system could be booted on a live-CD version of Slackware, and the standard zip utility provided with the distribution used.

See also 
 Lightweight Linux distribution

References

External links 
 The ZipSlack portion of the Slackware Web Site

Light-weight Linux distributions
Slackware
Linux distributions